SM Entertainment Japan (SMJ) is the Japanese branch and subsidiary of the South Korean entertainment company SM Entertainment. The company is employed in the sole administration of SM artists in Japan, handles exclusive licensing rights for the sales of albums, digital music, and merchandising, and facilitates the concert marketing for concerts and fan meetings held in Japan. It was established on January 22, 2001, with the Japanese record label Avex and Japanese television production company Yoshimoto Kogyo.

History

2001–2012: Establishment and Japanese market entry 

In an article released by Kukmin Ilbo, Lee Soo-man mentioned forming a Japanese subsidiary of SM Entertainment, SM Japan, regarding S.E.S. and its artists releasing Japanese-language releases from record companies in Japan rather than being released directly from SM. It was then announced that SM Japan would be established in a joint venture with Yoshimoto Kogyo, EAPS, Kurita Hideichi, and Pronet, investing 358.3 million won. The company was also launched along with the Japanese record label Avex. On March 7, 2001, SM held an event at Velfarre, a club located in Tokyo, to officially announce the establishment of SM Japan and BoA's entry into Japan with the release of the Jumping into the World album and was preparing to operate as an agency essential for Korean performers entering Japan. The company is employed in the premier management of SM artists in Japan, operates sole license rights for the sales of albums, digital music, and merchandise, and advertises the concert industry for concerts and fan meetings held in Japan. It was then reported that TVXQ was preparing to enter the market with a Japanese single to be released on April 27, 2005, while learning the language from the company's manager.

Lee Soo-man acknowledged the significance of overseas expansion in 2001 when overseas marketing was bare and has played a role in penetrating the Japanese market with BoA and Trax, with Nam So-young as the company's chief executive officer (CEO). With the success of BoA and TVXQ in the Japanese music market, J-Min, an artist of SM Entertainment Japan, debuted with the extended play Korogaru Ringo through Avex on September 12. On October 10, 2008, SM Japan established a subsidiary and opened a Korean food restaurant called Podo Namu on Nishi-Azabu in Tokyo, a restaurant specializing in developing and presenting Korean home cooking as a "luxury" dish. Through Avex's official website, the company and Avex Group had recently signed exclusive contracts with Super Junior and f(x) while introducing TVXQ's Yunho and Changmin, as Avex previously decided to remove JYJ members who had a conflict with SM. In an interview with Kim Young-min, he stated that SM previously authorized management along with the distribution of albums with SM Japan had been independently shifting performances and advertisements for Girls' Generation and its artists with comprehensive research and experience in the Japanese market in 2010.

2013–present: Further ventures, mergers, and acquisitions 
SM Entertainment Group, which started producing video content in various fields through SM Culture & Contents (SM C&C), established SM Contents Investment (SMCI) to guarantee quality content. SMCI was launched with the investment of SM Entertainment Japan to operate the network and facilitate diverse overseas projects. Kim Young-min, inaugurated as CEO of SM Entertainment in May 2005, became a representative of overseas subsidiaries, SM Asia and SM Japan. It was reported that the company recorded losses due to its "intensive" investment in temporary costs to establish a management system in the first quarter, with the annual operating profit in 2012 exceeding 10 billion won as of the March 2013 accounting settlement. Previously, SM, Avex Vanguard (AVI), and Universal Music Japan established a joint venture, Everysing Japan, in May 2014 and is currently a subsidiary of SM Japan as per its website. On June 23, 2014, SM stated that it was ordered to pay 10.2 billion won in corporate tax while asserting the additional corporate tax payment was due to the difference in the foreign tax deduction limit for sales generated by SM Japan.

A news article released by Maeil Business Newspaper declared that SM Japan had already achieved K-pop localization and attracted more than 2.1 million concert goers in 2015, establishing a 15% growth from 2014. As part of Shinee's promotion for the group's "Kiminoseide" (2016) release, Shinyan, an imitation of the group members and is under the company, will debut with the song "Kiminoseide (For Cat)" (2016) to offer their music more intimately to the public through cats. On August 12, 2016, SM Japan announced that it had decided to invest approximately 13 billion won in Digital Adventure (DA), a JASDAQ-listed company and a Japanese subsidiary of KeyEast. The announcement was made when SM and KeyEast signed a business agreement as a strategic partner to establish business partnerships in various fields. Consequently, the company was expected to become the second-largest shareholder as it invested in DA with a third-party paid-in capital increase. In September 2016, the company started capital participation with Stream Media Corporation (SMC) as per the company history page on SMC's official website.

IRiver then merged with SM Mobile Communications (SM MC) and acquired a 100% stake in SM Life Design Company Japan (SM LDC), a subsidiary of SM Japan, with 30 billion won of the endowment amount. SM LDC was a company dedicated to distributing SM content and goods in Japan. On April 13, 2020, SM announced that SM Entertainment Japan had established its subsidiaries SMEJ and SMEJ Plus through the material division. On October 5, 2021, SM announced that its subsidiary SMEJ would merge with SM F&B Development Japan, based on Japanese company law, aimed to reduce costs and enhance management efficiency by incorporating management resources. The merger date happened on December 21 with a ratio of 1:0, citing that the merger company owns 100% of the stake in the consolidation organization and does not issue new shares.

Subsidiaries 

 Everysing Japan (2014)
 Stream Media Corporation (2016)
 SM F&B Development Japan (2017)
 Beyond Live Corporation (2020)
 SMEJ Plus (2020)
Former subsidiaries
 SM Life Design Company Japan

Artists

Notes

References

External links 

 Official website

SM Entertainment subsidiaries
Japanese companies established in 2001
Companies based in Tokyo
Advertising agencies of Japan
Licensing organizations